Discovery School may refer to:
 Discovery School, Tegucigalpa, a bilingual English/Spanish school in Tegucigalpa, Honduras
 Discovery, a former primary school now part of Ao Tawhiti, a state area school in Christchurch, New Zealand

See also
 Discovery (disambiguation)
 Discovery Academy (disambiguation)
 Discovery New School, a defunct Montessori free school in Crawley, England